Paulus  (Bishop of Alexandretta, fl. 518) was a 6th-century Bishop of Alexandria Minor  or Alexandretta in modern Turkey.

Paulus was a Monophysite, so a christologic heretic from the Catholic and orthodox point of view. Paulus, was deposed by the Byzantine Emperor Justinian around 518AD. along with many other bishops of the area.

References

Bishops in Turkey by diocese
People convicted of heresy